"Stuck Inside of Mobile with the Memphis Blues Again" (also listed as "Memphis Blues Again") is a song by American singer-songwriter Bob Dylan which was released on his seventh studio album Blonde on Blonde (1966). The song was written by Dylan, and produced by Bob Johnston. It has nine verses, each featuring a distinct set of characters and circumstances.

All twenty takes of "Stuck Inside of Mobile with the Memphis Blues Again" were recorded in the early hours of February 17, 1966, at Columbia Records's A Studio in Nashville, Tennessee, with take 20 selected for the album.
This version also appears on 1971's Bob Dylan's Greatest Hits Vol. II. An earlier take was released on The Bootleg Series Vol. 7: No Direction Home: The Soundtrack in 2005, and other takes were issued on The Bootleg Series Vol. 12: The Cutting Edge 1965–1966 in 2015. The song has received a positive reception from critics.

Dylan has played the song live in concert 748 times, from 1976 to 2010. A live version recorded in May 1976 was included Hard Rain (1976), and was also released as a single with "Rita May" as the B-side. It received a generally negative critical reception.

Recording 
The album Another Side of Bob Dylan (1964) saw Bob Dylan start to move away from the contemporary folk music sound that had characterized his early albums. Bringing It All Back Home (1965) featured both electric and acoustic tracks, and Highway 61 Revisited later that year was purely electric. In 1965, he hired the Hawks as his backing group, but recording sessions in New York for a new album were not productive with them, and he accepted a suggestion from his producer Bob Johnston that the recording sessions should transfer to Nashville, Tennessee. Dylan went to Nashville in February 1966, with Al Kooper and Robbie Robertson from the New York sessions also making the trip.

The track features Dylan singing and playing harmonica, and Kooper on organ with members of the A-Team of studio musicians that had been engaged for the album sessions: Charlie McCoy, Wayne Moss and Joe South (guitars), Hargus Robbins (piano), Henry Strzelecki (electric bass) and Kenneth Buttrey (drums). All twenty takes of "Stuck Inside of Mobile with the Memphis Blues Again" were recorded in the early hours of February 17, 1966, at Columbia Records's Studio A. Dylan reworked the song in the studio, revising lyrics and changing the song's structure as he recorded different takes. According to Clinton Heylin, most of the revisions were to the song's arrangement, rather than to the words. Eventually, after recording for three hours, a master take, the twentieth and final take, lasting seven minutes and six seconds, was chosen. It was released as the second track on side two of Dylan's seventh studio album, the double album Blonde on Blonde, on June 20, 1966. Take five was released on The Bootleg Series Vol. 7: No Direction Home: The Soundtrack (2005).

In 2015, take 13 was released on the two-disc edition of The Bootleg Series Vol. 12: The Cutting Edge 1965–1966. This, and four additional takes were on the six-disc Deluxe edition, and the entire recording session was released on the 18-disc Collector's Edition. The song has sometimes been listed as "Memphis Blues Again" or "Stuck Inside Of Memphis With The" on album releases; the correct title first appeared when it was in included on Bob Dylan's Greatest Hits Vol. II (1971).

Critical comments
Michael Gray identified several possible influences on "Stuck Inside of Mobile with the Memphis Blues Again", including "The Memphis Blues" by W.C. Handy, who wrote the music, published in 1912, and George A. Norton, who wrote the lyrics the following year; Ma Rainey's "Memphis Bound Blues" (1925); "South Memphis Blues" by Frank Stokes (1929); and "North Memphis Blues" by Memphis Minnie (1930). Gray sees similarities with the Bukka White song "Aberdeen Mississippi Blues" (1940), which has the line "Sittin' down in Aberdeen with New Orleans on my mind".

The song has nine verses, each, according to critic Andy Gill, providing "an absurd little vignette illustrating contemporary alienation". Musicologist Wilfrid Mellers describes the song as strophic; Literature scholar Timothy Hampton felt that Dylan's "technique of varying the chorus as a way of isolating the singer from the listener" that he employed on some of the Blonde on Blonde tracks is in evidence on "Stuck Inside of Mobile with the Memphis Blues Again", where the chorus is sung differently by Dylan each time. 

Journalist Oliver Trager suggested that, like other Dylan songs of the time, the themes were "suspicion of authority figures, solicitous females, and a confused, persecuted, and possibly intoxicated narrator". Mellers wrote that the song, which features a list of characters including Shakespeare, Mona, Ruth, a ragman, a senator, a preacher and a rainman, railroad men and a deceased grandfather, gave "evidence of the interdependence in Dylan's songs of everyday reality and myth". Each verse includes a distinct set of characters and circumstances. Mike Marqusee felt that "thwarted escapism blends with a sense of impending doom" in the song. He added that:

The sociologist John Wells argued that the song "cannot possibly be wholly experienced as a truly remarkable work of art" from reading the lyrics alone, but only when listening to Dylan's performance. He posited that after listening to the track numerous times, listeners would realise that "Mobile no longer just means being stuck in an Alabama city, but... represents the grotesque, turbulent world we all inhabit". Communication studies scholar Keith Nainby wrote that Dylan "enacted  an  alienated,  tumultuous  narrative  persona  that  was  troubled, not comforted, by his place and time".

In a positive review of Blonde on Blonde for Asbury Park Press, Dave Margoshes of the considered the song, which he called a "surrealistic frenetic blues"," to be one of the four "outstanding" tracks on the album. Paul Williams named the track as his favorite from the album when he wrote in Crawdaddy in 1966 that it was "a chain of anecdotes bound together by an evocative chorus". He felt that "Dylan relates specific episodes and emotions in his offhand impressionistic manner, somehow making the universal specific and then making it universal again in that oh-so-accurate refrain." Williams also praised the musicianship, adding that he had never heard the organ "played so effectively" as by Kooper on the number. In the Record Mirror review, Norman Jopling wrote that the song was "jolly.. with a teen-beaty backing" and was "quite amusing".

Neil Spencer gave the song a rating of 5/5 stars in an Uncut magazine Dylan supplement in 2015, rating it as one of the three "grand statements on Blonde on Blonde, alongside "Sad Eyed Lady of the Lowlands" and "Visions of Johanna". Author John Nogowski rated the song as "A+". He described it as "a brilliantly funny portrait in black velvet of a world gone mad", and one of Dylan's "most perfectly realized songs".

Live performances
According to his website, Dylan played "Stuck Inside of Mobile with the Memphis Blues Again" 748 times in concert between 1976 and 2010. The first live performance was at the University of West Florida, Pensacola, on April 28, 1976, during the Rolling Thunder Revue tour. The performance at Tarrant County Convention Center Arena, Fort Worth, Texas, on May 16, 176, was included on the live album from the tour, Hard Rain, released on September 10, 1976. The album was produced by Don DeVito and Dylan. The Hard Rain version has a duration of six minutes and six seconds. An edited version of this album track, lasting three minutes and 35 seconds, was also released as a single in the United States on November 30, 1976, with "Rita May" as the B-side; the single did not chart. Critics received the Hard Rain version of the song, which omitted three verses from the original, negatively. Nogowski rated the version as a B+, but preferred the musicianship on the original.

Personnel

The personnel for the original album session were as follows.

Musicians
Bob Dylanvocals, acoustic guitar
Charlie McCoyacoustic guitar
Wayne Mosselectric guitar
Joe Southelectric guitar
Al Kooperorgan
Hargus Robbinspiano
Henry Strzeleckielectric bass
Kenneth Buttreydrums

Technical
Bob Johnstonproduction

References

Sources

External links
Lyrics at Bob Dylan's official website

Songs written by Bob Dylan
Bob Dylan songs
1966 songs
1976 singles
Song recordings produced by Bob Johnston
Columbia Records singles